Krynnspace (product code SJR7) is a supplement published by TSR in 1993 for the fantasy role-playing game Dungeons & Dragons that is a crossover between the Spelljammer and Dragonlance campaign settings.

Description
Krynnspace describes the star system of Krynn, the planet central to the Dragonlance setting, in terms of Spelljammer space travel. The book takes the reader on a guided tour of the entire system. A short introduction gives a quick overview of the system. The book then describes each body within Krynnspace: 
 The Sun, the battleground for an war between creatures from the plane of fire, and the sun's inhabitants, the Helions.
 Sirion, a planet of fire
 Reorx, inhabitable, and mainly a place of mines
 Krynn, the setting for Dragonlance
 Chislev, covered by jungles
 Zivilyn, a gas giant that has giant floating continents and twelve inhabitable moons
 Nehzmyth, a giant swamp
 The Star Islands, five tropical asteroids linked by magical bridges
 The Dark Clouds, a mysterious and terrifying nebula
The book also introduces several notable Spelljammers who ply their trade amongst the planets, and a basic overview of the gods who have an effect on this setting.

Publication history
In 1984, TSR released the Dragonlance campaign setting for Advanced Dungeons & Dragons. Five years later, TSR introduced Spelljammer, a campaign setting with a fantasy space environment.

In the early 1990s, TSR decided to combine Spelljammer with three of their most popular campaign settings. In 1991, TSR published Realmspace, which described the world of the Forgotten Realms in terms of Spelljammer. The following year, TSR gave the same treatment to the world of Greyhawk in Greyspace. In 1993, TSR released Krynnspace, which added the Spelljammer element to the world of Dragonlance. This 96-page softcover book with a color postcard enclosed was designed by Jean Rabe, with cartography by Newton Ewell, interior art by David C. Sutherland III and David O. Miller, and cover art by Miller.

Reception
Paul Westermeyer, writing for the website Spelljammer: Beyond the Moon, thought this product contained minimally more interesting non-player characters and locations than either of its predecessors Realmspace or Greyspace, but noted that Krynnspace had "no Dragonlance flavor nor any real Spelljammer flavor."

References

Role-playing game supplements introduced in 1993
Spelljammer supplements